The National Institute of Environmental Research, or NIER, is a research agency operated by the South Korean government.  Its president is Seong-Kyu Yoon. It is charged with environmental research, education, international cooperation, and setting criterion levels for various pollutants. The main building for the institute is located in Gyeongseo-dong, Seo-gu, Incheon.

NIER was first established in 1978 as the National Environment Protection Institute.  It gained its current name and status in 1986.

See also
Science in South Korea
Environment of South Korea
Government of South Korea

External links
Official site, in Korean and English

Incheon
Government agencies of South Korea